Grunow-Dammendorf is a municipality in the Oder-Spree district, in Brandenburg, Germany.

Geography

Division of the municipality
 Dammendorf
 Grunow

Demography

See also
Grunow (disambiguation)

References

Localities in Oder-Spree